Jordanian General Intelligence Directorate, or GID is the intelligence agency of the Hashemite Kingdom of Jordan. The GID is reportedly one of the most important and professional intelligence agencies in the Middle East; the agency has been instrumental in foiling several terrorist attacks both in Jordan and around the world.

Law and establishment
Before establishing GID, the department was known as the General Investigation Department (دائرة المباحث العامة) from 1952 to 1964.

GID was established in accordance with Act 24 of the year 1964 which went through all its constitutional stages.

The GID Director is appointed by royal decree, itself the result of a decision made by the Council of Ministers. On January 2, 2009, King Abdullah II replaced Muhammad Dahabi (brother of Nader Dahabi) as director with General Muhammad Raqqad, the former GID director. In 2012, Muhammad Dahabi was sentenced to 13 years imprisonment. Officers are also appointed by royal decree upon the recommendation of the Director-General; they all have university degrees in different majors and must go through a thorough security check before joining the service.

The duties of the GID is specified in law and consists of protecting the internal and external security of the Kingdom through carrying out necessary intelligence operations and executing duties assigned by the Prime Minister in writing.

Mission
As quoted from the official GID Site, their mission is

In practice, the agency is notoriously known for its extensive activity in Jordan and throughout the Middle East, as well as its cooperation with American, British, and Israeli intelligence.  Through a complex spying system, it plays a central role in preserving stability in Jordan and monitoring seditious activity.  The GID is believed to be the CIA's closest partner after MI6. The GID enjoys good relations with the Mossad, Israel's intelligence agency, but relations temporarily soured in 1997 after a Mossad attempt to assassinate Hamas leader Khaled Mashaal in Amman.

History
The GID was the main force behind maintaining Jordan's stability in the years after Black September, thwarting numerous terrorist plots. Even before the 9/11 attacks, the Jordanians had become key partners in the war on terror. In 1999, tips from the Mukhabarat alerted the CIA to plots by Bosnia-based terrorists against U.S. targets in Europe.

At the dawn of the new millennium, Jordanian Intelligence uncovered a large-scale terrorist plan to attack dozens of hotels across Jordan and the United States.  Jordan immediately relayed the information to Washington and the attacks were thwarted in both countries. The GID warned the United States of the impending 9/11 attacks. In late summer 2001, Jordanian intelligence intercepted a message implying that a major attack was being planned inside the US and that aircraft would be used. The message also revealed that the operation was codenamed "Big Wedding", which indeed turned out to be the codename of the 9/11 plot. The message was passed to US intelligence through several channels.

As many as 100 al Qaeda prisoners have passed through the Mukhabarat's Al Jafr prison in the southern desert. Among them are some of the biggest catches in the war on terror: Al Qaeda operations head Khalid Shaikh Mohammed and Persian Gulf chief Abd al-Rahim al Nashiri. The reliance of US intelligence on its Jordanian counterpart was forged in part by both countries’ aversion to Islamic radicalism. Their collaboration is believed to have helped quell the Al-Qaeda insurgency in Iraq and eliminate terrorist masterminds such as Abu Musab al Zarqawi.

The first director of the GID is Mohammad Rasol Kilani in 1964 and the current director is General Ahmad Husni.

On June 6, 2016, at 4:00 GMT, on the first day of the month of Ramadan, three GID officers were killed in an attack in the refugee camp located outside of Amman. The suspect was identified as Mahmoud Masharfeh. According to Al Jazeera, Masharfeh had been imprisoned between 2012 and 2014 for attempting to enter Gaza and join a group fighting Hamas. A source who was close to the suspect while he was in prison claims that Masharfeh has been trying to join ISIL and it is unknown whether he was able to. Soon after the attack Masharfeh was arrested.

Emblem
The Crown: The Hashemite Royal Crown represents the Constitutional Monarchy.
The Olive Wreath: Two branches of olive symbolizes prosperity, welfare, and peace.
The Shield: An Arabic Islamic shield carved on it 25 gates marking independence day, May 25, it also symbolizes defending the security of the nation and safeness of the Home Land.
The Eagle: One of the country's powerful birds, symbolizes power, invulnerability and having control over the target.
The Snake: Symbolizes the invisible enemy either internal or external.
The Two Swords: Two Arabian Swords crisscrossing behind the shield, symbolizing the use of power against terrorism, evil and corruption.
The Ribbon: A ribbon with the Quranic verse "say that justice has prevailed"  which represents truth and seeking to implement it. It also represents the base that the two swords and the two olive branches are settling on.
The Two Lightning Bolts: The two lightning bolts represent the name of one of their special forces. The two lightning bolts also symbolize the swiftness and accuracy of the General Intelligence Directorate.

References

External links

 GID.gov.jo - The official website of the GID

Government agencies established in 1964
Intelligence agencies
General Intelligence Directorate
Law enforcement in Jordan
Divisions and subsidiaries of the prime ministry (Jordan)
Secret police